For the equivalent tournament in the Republic of Ireland, see FAI Women's Cup.

The IFA Women's Challenge Cup or Irish Women's Cup is the annual cup competition of women's football teams in Northern Ireland. It was first contested in 2005.

Format
The eight Women's Premier League teams enter the cup in the third round. Up to 32 other teams enter in the first round, if more enter a preliminary round is played.

List of finals
The list of finals:

References

External links
Cup at IrishFA.com
Cup at NIWFA, Northern Ireland Women's Football Association
Cup at women.soccerway.com

Nort
Women's association football competitions in Northern Ireland
Recurring sporting events established in 2005
2005 establishments in Northern Ireland
Association football cup competitions in Northern Ireland